Cossulus nikiforoviorum is a moth in the family Cossidae. It is found in Uzbekistan.

The length of the forewings is 14–15 mm. There is a mottled pattern on the forewings. The postdiscal band consists of isolated spots and there are ochraceous spots in the discal zone. The hindwings are light brown.

References

Natural History Museum Lepidoptera generic names catalog

Moths described in 2006
Cossinae
Moths of Asia